Rothschildia maurus is a moth of the family Saturniidae. It is found in South America, including Paraguay, Argentina and Bolivia.

Maurus
Moths described in 1879